Rosedale Park may refer to:

 Rosedale Park (Kansas City, Kansas), park in Kansas City, Kansas
 Rosedale Park, park which once contained Rosedale Field, a grandstand stadium in Toronto, Ontario, Canada
 Rosedale Park Historic District (Detroit, Michigan)
 Rosedale Park, New Zealand, in Auckland, New Zealand. Home ground of Albany United association football club